Kumira Multilateral High School is a public high school situated at the centre of kumira bazzar in Tala Upazila, Satkhira district, part of the Khulna division, in south-western Bangladesh. About 1,800 students study there.

The school celebrated 100 years foundation day on 17 and 18 December 2015.

Students uniform
Male follow the dress code below:

 White half shirt with school logo (summer)
 White full shirt with school logo( winter)
 Bottle black pant
 Black belt
 White shoe
 White socks
Female student follow the dress code below:
 White red kamij with school logo(summer)
 White red kamij full with school logo(winter)

References

High schools in Bangladesh
1914 establishments in India